The Michigan Rugby Football Union (MRFU) is the Local Area Union (LAU) for Rugby Union teams in the state of Michigan.  The MRFU is part of the Midwest Rugby Football Union (MRFU), one of the seven Territorial Area Unions (TAU's) that comprise USA Rugby.

Men’s Clubs
 Battle Creek
 Detroit RFC
 Detroit Tradesmen Rugby Club Detroit Tradesmen
 Findlay SCARS
 Flint Rogues Rugby Club 
 Eastside Anchormen Rugby Club 
 Fraser
 Grand Rapids
 Kalamazoo
 Lansing Capital Area Crisis RFC
 Michiana
 Michigan RFC
 Oakland Highlanders
 Toledo Celtics
 Traverse City Blues
 Tri-City Barbarians

Women’s Clubs
 Ann Arbor
 Detroit RFC
 Flint Sirens
 Kalamazoo

Collegiate Clubs - Men
 Bowling Green University
  Calvin College
 Central Michigan University
 Davenport University 
 Ferris State University 
 Grand Valley State University 
 Hillsdale College
 Hope College
 Lake Superior State University
 North Central Michigan College
 Northern Michigan University
 Oakland University
 Michigan State University
 Saginaw Valley State University 
 University of Michigan
 University of Michigan-Dearborn
 Western Michigan University
 Wayne State University

Collegiate Clubs - Women
 Bowling Green State University
 Central Michigan University 
 Ferris State University 
 Grand Valley State University 
  Michigan State University
 Northern Michigan University 
 Saginaw Valley State University 
 University of Michigan
 Wayne State University 
 Western Michigan University

Youth Clubs - Boys
 Ann Arbor 
 Anthony Wayne 
 Battle Creek 
 Berkley HS 
 Birmingham Area Youth Rugby Football Club (Buc Rugby), Birmingham, MI
 Brighton 
 Dearborn 
 Dexter Devils Rugby Football Club Dexter, MI
 Forest Hills 
 Grand Blanc 
 Grand Haven 
 Grand Rapids Catholic 
 Grandville 
 Howell 
 Kalamazoo 
 Kenowa Hills 
 Lakeview HS 
 Livonia HS 
 Lowell 
 Knights Rugby Club (KRC), Northville
 Rockford 
 Sparta 
 Traverse City 
 Troy United 
 Washtenaw 
 West Ottawa

Youth Clubs - Girls
 Grandville Girl's Rugby Club 
 Ann Arbor Pioneers 
 Berkley HS 
 Redford Thurston
 Traverse City Blues
 Toledo Girls Rugby Football Club 
 Lakeview Huskies

External links
 MRFU website
 Midwest Rugby Football Union
 The Midwest Rugby Links Page - Michigan

Sports in Michigan
Rugby union governing bodies in the United States
Rugby union in Michigan